László Rezes (born 12 August 1987 in Debrecen) is a Hungarian football (midfielder) player who currently plays for DEAC.

Club career

Debrecen
Rezes won the 2009–10 season of the Hungarian League with Debrecen despite his team lost to Kecskeméti TE in the last round. In 2010 Debrecen beat Zalaegerszegi TE in the Hungarian Cup final in the Puskás Ferenc Stadium by 3–2.

On 1 May 2012 Rezes won the Hungarian Cup with Debrecen by beating MTK Budapest on penalty shoot-out in the 2011–12 season. This was the fifth Hungarian Cup trophy for Debrecen.

On 12 May 2012 Rezes won the Hungarian League title with Debrecen after beating Pécs in the 28th round of the Hungarian League by 4–0 at the Oláh Gábor út Stadium which resulted the sixth Hungarian League title for the Hajdús.

Club statistics

Updated to games played as of 17 August 2014.

Honours

 Debreceni VSC
Hungarian National Championship I: 2009–10
Hungarian League Cup: 2010

References

1987 births
Living people
Sportspeople from Debrecen
Hungarian footballers
Association football midfielders
Debreceni VSC players
Létavértes SC players
Kecskeméti TE players
Vasas SC players
Nyíregyháza Spartacus FC players
Nemzeti Bajnokság I players